Romero Lubambo (born 1955) is a Brazilian jazz guitarist.

Career
He was born in Rio de Janeiro, Brazil. He grew up with American jazz and classical music in the house because his uncle played guitar, lived next door, and visited frequently. Lubambo tried classical piano for two years but quit. At thirteen, he picked up the guitar and taught himself how to play because there was no one else around to do it. The following year he joined a band and performed professionally for the first time. From 1972 to 1977, he attended the Villa-Lobos School of Music to study classical guitar. He went to college and got a degree in engineering in 1980, but he pursued music instead.

After moving to the U.S. in 1985, he worked with singer Astrud Gilberto. During the next year, he met Herbie Mann, who Lubambo considered "my American father, my mentor for life." He formed Trio da Paz with Duduka da Fonseca and Nilson Matta and has recorded and toured with them. He tours extensively with Dianne Reeves. He has also worked with Claudia Acuña, Leny Andrade, Gato Barbieri, Michael Brecker, Larry Coryell, Regina Carter, Dave Douglas, Paquito D'Rivera, Diana Krall, Ivan Lins, Wynton Marsalis, Pat Metheny, Jason Miles, Jane Monheit, Hermeto Pascoal, Flora Purim and Airto Moreira, Dan Costa (composer), Luciana Souza and Billie Eilish.

Dos Navegantes, a collaboration album by him, Edu Lobo and Mauro Senise, won the 2017 Latin Grammy Award for Best MPB Album.

Discography

As leader
 Autonomia with Rildo Hora (Visom, 1990)
 Face to Face, with Weber Drummond (GSP, 1993)
 Shades of Rio, with Raphael Rabello (Chesky, 1993)
 Infinite Love with Gil Goldstein (Big World, 1993)
 Coisa Fina with Leny Andrade (Perfil, 1994)
 Two (GSP, 1994)
 Lubambo (Avant, 1999)
 Duo, with César Camargo Mariano (Sunnyside, 2002)
 Brazilian Routes (Rob, 2002)
 Rio de Janeiro Underground (Victor, 2003)
 Romero Lubambo & Lica Cecat (Sony, 2003)
 Coisa Fina, with Leny Andrade (Perfil, 2003)
 Softly with Herbie Mann (Maxjazz, 2006)
 Love Dance (JVC, 2007)
 Bons Amigos (Resonance, 2011
 Só: Brazilian Essence (Sunnyside, 2014)
 Setembro: A Brazilian Under the Jazz Influence (Sunnyside, 2015)
 Todo Sentimento with Mauro Senise (2016)
 Sampa (Sunnyside, 2017)

With Trio da Paz
 Brazil from the Inside (Concord, 1992)
 Black Orpheus (Kokopelli, 1994)
 Somewhere (Blue Toucan, 2005)
 Live at Jazz Baltica (Maxjazz, 2008)

As a featured artist
 Skyness, Dan Costa (composer) (2018)

As sideman
 Jasil Brazz, Herbie Mann (1987)
 Tico! Tico!, Paquito D'Rivera (1989)
 The New York Chorinhos, David Chesky (Chesky, 1990)
 Caminho de Casa, Herbie Mann (Chesky, 1990)
 Rhythmstick, Dizzy Gillespie (1990)
 This Is Me, Emily Remler (1990)
 Mais, Marisa Monte (World Pacific, 1991)
 Brazilian Rhapsody, Lee Konitz (Musicmasters, 1995)
 Chasin' the Gypsy, James Carter' (Atlantic, 2000)
 You Inspire Me, Diane Hubka (2001)
 Brazilian Nights, Jason Miles (2002)
 Plays Jobim, Charlie Byrd (2002)
 Rhythm of Life, Claudia Acuña (2002)
Canta Brasil, Kenny Barron (Sunnyside, 2002)
 Sweet Talk, Eric Marienthal (2003)
 Freak In, Dave Douglas (RCA, 2003)
 Sketches of Broadway, Janis Siegel (2004)
 Taking a Chance on Love, Jane Monheit (2004)
 Slow, Ann Hampton Callaway (2004)
 Trios, Grover Washington (2004)
 Tropical Postcards, Roseanna Vitro (2004)
 Amanecer, Joey Calderazzo (Marsalis Music, 2006)
 The New Bossa Nova, Luciana Souza (Verve, 2007)
 Art of Love: Music of Machaut, Robert Sadin (2009)
 Simpatico, Claudio Roditi (2010)
 In the Moonlight, Sophie Milman (2011)
 Light My Fire, Eliane Elias (2011)
 The Heart of the Matter, Jane Monheit (2013)

References

External links
 Romero Lubambo's official web site

1955 births
Living people
Brazilian jazz guitarists
Brazilian male guitarists
Musicians from Rio de Janeiro (city)
Latin Grammy Award winners
Male jazz musicians
Trio da Paz members
Sunnyside Records artists